Jeremy Bordeleau (born April 30, 1987 in Trois-Rivières, Quebec) is a male athlete who competes in canoeing. He won a silver medal at the 2007 Pan American Games in the men's K-4 1,000 metres event, along with Angus Mortimer, Mark de Jonge and Chris Pellini.

See also
 List of canoe/kayak athletes by country

References
 Profile from Canadian Olympic Committee

1987 births
Canadian male canoeists
Canoeists at the 2007 Pan American Games
Carleton University alumni
Living people
Sportspeople from Trois-Rivières
Pan American Games silver medalists for Canada
Pan American Games medalists in canoeing
Medalists at the 2007 Pan American Games
21st-century Canadian people